Wise Ridge is a sharp-crested ridge,  long, extending southwest to northeast between Dahe Glacier and Willis Glacier in the Saint Johns Range of Victoria Land. It was named by the Advisory Committee on Antarctic Names in 2005 after Sherwood W. Wise, Jr., Antarctic Marine Geology Research Facility, Florida State University, who had a significant part in the planning, coring, analyzing, and storage of Southern Ocean geological specimens, 1973–2004.

References

Ridges of Victoria Land